"The Walk In" is the third episode of the second season of the American television drama series The Americans, and the 16th overall episode of the series. It originally aired on FX in the United States on March 12, 2014.

Plot
Philip and Elizabeth infiltrate a factory and Philip takes pictures of propeller plans. Afterward, Elizabeth visits Jared Connors, intent on delivering a letter from his mother, as she had promised before his mother's death. However, Elizabeth changes her mind about giving it to him after knowing his mental condition. Back home, Paige skips school to track down Elizabeth's "aunt." Stan investigates Dameran's work history with the World Bank, only to learn it is a cover for an assassination attempt on a bank official.

Production
The episode was written by Stuart Zicherman and directed by Constantine Makris.

Reception
The A.V. Club Emily VanDerWerff gave the episode an A−.

References

External links
 "The Walk In" at FX
 

The Americans (season 2) episodes
2014 American television episodes
Television episodes directed by Constantine Makris